The 1980–81 Serie A season was won by Juventus.

Teams
Como, Pistoiese and Brescia had been promoted from Serie B.

Final classification

Results

Top goalscorers

References and sources
Almanacco Illustrato del Calcio - La Storia 1898-2004, Panini Edizioni, Modena, September 2005

External links

 :it:Classifica calcio Serie A italiana 1981 - Italian version with pictures and info.
  - All results on RSSSF Website.

Serie A seasons
Italy
1980–81 in Italian football leagues